General Goddard may refer to:

George William Goddard (1889–1987), U.S. Air Force brigadier general
Henry Arthur Goddard (1869–1955), Australian Army temporary brigadier general
Rick Goddard (fl. 1960s–2000s), U.S. Air Force major general